The squash players  Nicol David (Malaysia) and Natalie Grinham  (Netherlands)  have a long rivalry. They have met 32 times during  their careers, with David leading their overall head-to-head series 25–7. Natalie is David's most frequent opponent on tour. 16 of their matches have been in tournament finals, including two in the World Open tournament. The World Open 2006 final between David and Natalie is dubbed to be one of the greatest in the Women's World Open history.

The longest match between the duo is in the 2007 CIMB Kuala Lumpur Open;  which saw David go on to win in a five set match that lasted in 102  minutes. David won 6–9, 9–3,  9–6, 7–9, 9–6. On 27 September 2009, in the $118,000 2009 Women's World Open final, David won the match in four sets 3–11, 11–6, 11–3, 11–8 to become only the third player in the history of the championships to win four titles, alongside Australia's Sarah Fitz-Gerald and New Zealander Susan Devoy.

List of all matches

Notes

 H  represents hour while MM represents minutes.
  Natalie Grinham switched allegiance to the Netherlands from March 2008  onwards.
 WISPA tournament uses PAR scoring from 21 July 2008 onwards.

References

External links
Overall Head to Head
WISPA Head to Head

Squash rivalries